I Didn't Do It may refer to:

I Didn't Do It (film), a 1945 British comedy crime film
I Didn't Do It (TV series), a 2014 American television series
"I Didn't Do It", a Bart Simpson catchphrase from The Simpson's episode "Bart Gets Famous"

See also
I Just Didn't Do It, a 2007 Japanese film